Huckleberry is a common name used in North America for several species of plants.

Huckleberry may also refer to:

Places
 Huckleberry Island, in Long Island Sound and part of New Rochelle, New York
 Huckleberry Botanic Regional Preserve, in the eastern San Francisco Bay area of California

People
 Huckleberry Huck Seed (born 1969), American poker player
 Alan Huckleberry (born 1941), American mathematician
 Earl Huckleberry (1910–1999), American Major League Baseball pitcher
 Mike Huckleberry (born 1948), politician, restaurateur, and small business owner in Michigan

Other uses
 Huckleberry Finn, title character in Adventures of Huckleberry Finn by Mark Twain
 Huckleberry Hound, a cartoon character
 Huckleberry Railroad, a narrow gauge heritage railroad in Crossroads Village, Michigan
 Huckleberry Trail, a rail trail in Montgomery County, Virginia

See also 
 Huckleberry Ridge Tuff, a geologic formation that lies partially in Yellowstone National Park
 
 Huck (disambiguation)
 Solanum scabrum, a garden huckleberry in the family Solanaceae 
 Cyrilla racemiflora, called "he huckleberry", in the family Cyrillaceae